Chess was contested at the 2011 Summer Universiade from August 15 to August 21 at the Meihua Hall of the Shenzhen Conference and Exhibition Center in Shenzhen, China. Men's and women's individual and mixed team competitions were held. It was the first time that chess was included in a Universiade.

Medal summary

Medal table

Events

References 

Summer Universiade
2011 Summer Universiade events
Summer Universiade 2011
2011